Ovo vegetarianism  is a type of vegetarianism which allows for the consumption of eggs but not dairy products, in contrast with lacto vegetarianism. Those who practice ovo vegetarianism are called ovo-vegetarians. "Ovo" comes from the Latin word for egg.

Motivations

Ethical motivations for excluding dairy products are based on issues with the industrial practices behind the production of milk. Concerns include the practice of keeping a cow constantly pregnant in order for her to lactate and the slaughter of unwanted male calves. Other concerns include the standard practice of separating the mother from her calf and denying the calf its natural source of milk.  This contrasts with the industrial practices surrounding egg-laying hens, which produce eggs for human consumption without being fertilized.  Ovo-vegetarians often prefer free-range eggs, that is, those produced by uncaged hens. Many ovo-vegetarians refuse to eat fertilized eggs, with balut being an extreme example where the egg has developed.

Some vegetarians are lactose intolerant and have a casein allergy, and are therefore unwilling to consume milk or other dairy products.

Concerns

Ethical concerns about the consumption of eggs arise from the practice of culling male chicks shortly after birth. Practices considered humane for chick culling include maceration and suffocation using carbon dioxide.

One of the main differences between a vegan and an ovo-vegetarian diet is the avoidance of eggs. Vegans do not consume eggs under any circumstances.

See also 

 Lacto vegetarianism
 Lacto-ovo vegetarianism
 List of diets
 List of dairy products
 List of vegetable dishes
 List of vegetarian restaurants
 List of egg dishes

References

Vegetarian diets
Eggs (food)
Eggs in culture

pt:Vegetarianismo#Ovovegetarianismo